Minna Kaarina Heinonen (born 26 August 1967 in Harjavalta) is a Finnish archer.

Archery

Heinonen finished 56th at the 1988 Summer Olympic Games in the women's individual event with 1163 points. She also finished thirteenth in the women's team event as part of the Finland team.

References

External links 
 Profile on worldarchery.org

1967 births
Living people
Finnish female archers
Olympic archers of Finland
Archers at the 1988 Summer Olympics
People from Harjavalta
Sportspeople from Satakunta